Jamie Heath may refer to:

 Jamey Heath, political activist in Ontario, Canada
 Jamie Heath (cricketer) (born 1977), Australian cricketer